The Cireș is a right tributary of the river Bâsca in Romania.

References

Rivers of Romania
Rivers of Covasna County